This is a list of Marquette Golden Avalanche football players in the NFL Draft.

Key

Selections

References

Marquette

Marquette Golden Avalanche NFL Draft